Jack Connor may refer to:

Jack Connor (footballer, born 1911) (1911–1994), Scottish football centre forward
Jack Connor (footballer, born 1919) (1919–1998), English football centre forward for Stockport County
Jack Connor (footballer, born 1934) (1934–2010), English football defender for Huddersfield Town & Bristol City

See also
John Connor (disambiguation)
Jack Connors (disambiguation)
Jack O'Connor (disambiguation)
Connor (surname)